Peter Wright (born in Penrith, New South Wales) is an Australian former professional rugby league footballer who played in the 1960s and 1970s. He played for the Parramatta Eels and Penrith Panthers in the New South Wales Rugby League premiership competition.

Sources
 Whiticker, Alan & Hudson, Glen (2006) The Encyclopedia of Rugby League Players, Gavin Allen Publishing, Sydney

References

Living people
Australian rugby league players
Parramatta Eels players
Penrith Panthers players
Rugby articles needing expert attention
Rugby league players from Penrith, New South Wales
Rugby league props
Year of birth missing (living people)